The Bedford Village Inn is an historic hotel in Bedford, New Hampshire, US.

The Inn has been built up around the core of an early 1800s farmhouse. From 1981, it was redeveloped as hotel and restaurant, fully opening in October 1986. It is now owned by Jack and Andrea Carnevale.

References

Bedford, New Hampshire
Hotel buildings on the National Register of Historic Places in New Hampshire
National Register of Historic Places in Hillsborough County, New Hampshire
Buildings and structures in Hillsborough County, New Hampshire
Hotels in New Hampshire